Yazhelbitsy is a village (selo) in Valdaysky District of Novgorod Oblast, Russia, located on the M 10 highway  south-east of Veliky Novgorod.

It was the site of the 1456 Treaty of Yazhelbitsy between Grand Prince Vasily II (r. 1425-1462) and Novgorod the Great, in which Novgorod's political independence was strictly curtailed.  Failure to abide by the treaty led to Novgorod's defeat at Shelon River in 1471 and its final subjugation by Moscow in 1478.

References

Notes

Sources

Rural localities in Novgorod Oblast
Valdaysky Uyezd